Nicolas Dougall (born 21 November 1992) is a South African Triathlete, and Ex professional road cyclist, who last rode for UCI WorldTeam .

Dougall was born in Hertfordshire in the United Kingdom, but grew up in Brisbane, Australia. His first Grand Tour was the 2016 Vuelta a España.

After five years with Team Dimension Data (formerly MTN - Qhubeka) Nic returned to his roots as a triathlete, with his first race being Barcelona Ironman 70.3 on Sunday 19 May 2019.

Career achievements

Major results
2009 
 1st, World ITU Sprint Distance Triathlon, Queensland Australia.
2011 
1st Stage 1 (TTT) Tour of Tasmania

2012 
3rd Stage Princess Maha Chakri Sirindhorn's Cup Tour of Thailand

2013 
7th National Championships South-Africa U23 - Road Race

2014
 National Under–23 Road Championships
2nd Time trial
3rd Road race

2015 
18th GC Tour du Poitou Charentes

5th   Tour du Poitou Charentes - Youth classification

2016 
18th World Championships - Road Race

8th  Tour of Croatia - Stage 5 (TTT)

2017
5th Time trial, National Road Championships
13th Tour de Suisse - Points classification

2018 
21st Scheldeprijs

2019 
6th Ironman 70.3 Barcelona

Grand Tour general classification results timeline

External links

References

1992 births
Living people
South African male cyclists